Chen Shen-yuan (born 18 April 1964) is a Taiwanese weightlifter. He competed in the men's flyweight event at the 1984 Summer Olympics.

References

1964 births
Living people
Taiwanese male weightlifters
Olympic weightlifters of Taiwan
Weightlifters at the 1984 Summer Olympics
Place of birth missing (living people)